Costus spicatus, also known as spiked spiralflag ginger or Indian head ginger, is a species of herbaceous plant in the Costaceae family (also sometimes placed in Zingiberaceae).

Distribution
Costus spicatus is native to the Caribbean (including Dominica, Guadeloupe, Hispaniola, Martinique, and Puerto Rico).

Description
It produces a short red cone, from which red-orange flowers emerge one at a time. In botanical literature, Costus woodsonii has often been misidentified as Costus spicatus.

Cultivation
Costus spicatus will grow in full sun if it is kept moist.

Ecology
Costus spicatus can develop a symbiotic partnership with certain species of ants (often only a single species of ant will be compatible). The ants are provided with a food source (nectar in C. spicatus flowers) as well as a place to construct a nest. In turn, the ants protect developing seeds from herbivorous insects.

Medicinal use
In Dominican folk medicine, an herbal tea made from the leaves of C. spicatus is used for diabetes (hyperglycemia). However, a 2009 study concluded that C. spicatus tea "...had no efficacy in the treatment of obesity-induced hyperglycemia."

References

spicatus
Flora of Puerto Rico
Flora of Cuba
Flora of Haiti
Flora of the Dominican Republic
Flora of the Windward Islands
Flora of the Leeward Islands
Garden plants
Flora without expected TNC conservation status